Pheidole tysoni is a species of ant and a higher myrmicine in the family Formicidae.

References

Further reading

 

tysoni
Articles created by Qbugbot
Insects described in 1901